The State Committee for Family, Women and Children Affairs of Azerbaijan Republic is a governmental agency within the Cabinet of Azerbaijan in charge of regulation of activities for protection of rights of women and children and overseeing activities of non-governmental organizations involved in family in Azerbaijan Republic. The ministry is headed by Bahar Muradova.

History
On January 14, 1998 the State Committee on Women’s Affairs was established by Presidential Decree. On February 6, 2006 committee expanded with additional duties for solution of problems of families and children thus being re-established as the State Committee for Family, Women and Children Affairs. Since its inception, the committees has promoted independence of women in civil societies in terms of earning for living and functioning while the lead family providers are away.

Structure

In close cooperation with NGO Alliance for Children Rights, the committee has worked on combating domestic violence in the democratic society, an education campaign conducted among the children needed in special care for prevention of violence, suicide attempts, human trafficking, children crimes, exploitation of children labor, early marriages, harmful habits, as well as for getting the religious knowledge'.

Activity of the Committee 

Support centers for families and children were established in Mingachevir, Goranboy and Shuvalan with the financial support of the US Agency for International Development (USAID). At the center, young boys and girls are educated about health; they develop social communication skills and life skills. To date, thousands of children, young people and parents have been serving in all centers.

The State Program on the Delivering Children from Children's State Institutions to Children (De-institutionalization) and Alternative Care State in Azerbaijan was approved by presidential decree No. 1386 dated March 29, 2006.

Juvenile justice reform is supported by the UNICEF office in Baku. Adaptation of refugee children to society and improvement of their well-being are the third priority direction in the field of child protection.

Events 
Within the framework of the 15th anniversary of the establishment of the Commonwealth of Independent States, a catalog dedicated to prominent women of Azerbaijan was published.

The First International Festival "Women's World: Beauty and Health" was organized by the State Committee for Family, Women and Children Affairs, Ministry of Youth and Sports and the Ministry of Health on October 6–7 in the Palace of Hand Games.

On October 13, the "Azerbaijan" hall of the European hotel hosted the Republican Conference "Development of women entrepreneurship in Azerbaijan: strategy and perspectives".

On June 19 and 20, 2006, Spain hosted the 3rd International Conference on the Problem of Creating a Favorable Environment for Children in Europe and Central Asia. The representatives of the Committee took part in that conference.

State Committee for Family, Women and Children Affairs of Azerbaijan attended “Changes in Parentage: Children Today – Parents Tomorrow” the 28th session of the Conference of the European Ministers responsible for family affairs, (Lisbon, 16–17 May 2006) and the 6th Conference of Ministers of Council of Europe for women and men equality which was held in Stockholm, Sweden on 8–9 June 2006. The subject of the conference was “Human rights and economic calls in Europe – gender equality”.

International relations 

 A Memorandum of cooperation was signed between State Committee for Family, Women and Children Affairs of Azerbaijan and The National Commission for Women's Affairs of the Hashemite Kingdom of Jordan on October 20, 2014 in Baku. 
 An Administrative Agreement was signed between State Committee for Family, Women and Children Affairs of Azerbaijan and Minister of Labour and Social Security Provisions of France on January 30, 2007.
 An Agreement on cooperation for women, children and family issues was signed between the State Committee for Family, Women and Children Affairs of Azerbaijan and the Committees for Women's Affairs of Kuwait on January 26, 2010.
 State Committee for Family, Women and Children Affairs signed an Agreement on Mutual Cooperation together with the Ministry of Labor and Social Protection of Belarus on June 3, 2010.
 On June 15, 2010, a Memorandum on cooperation in the field of family, women development and child protection was signed between the Committee and the Ministry of Social Development, Family and Solidarity of the Kingdom of Morocco.
 On October 25, 2011, the Government of the Republic of Turkey signed a Protocol on Cooperation in the field of family, women and children affairs policy.
 State Committee for Family, Women and Children Affairs signed  Memorandum of Understanding together with the Ministry of Welfare of the Republic of Latvia on August 29, 2012.

Twinning projects  
The Twinning project was designed by the European Commission and started in the context of the European Union's (EU) expansion in 1998. This has been recognized as a means of administrative cooperation key to assist candidate countries as future members of the European Union to strengthen the capacity of the Union's legislation. This opportunity has also been opened for countries which gained independence in recent years and the southern region of the Mediterranean. These countries are instruments of implementing action plans for the European Neighborhood Policy.

France was selected to implement the project together with the SCFWCA. Entities involved in the project from the French Republic are General Directorate for Social Cohesion, a part of Solidarity and Social Union.

This project was designed to achieve the results determined by the EAPC, EU Delegation and France partners. The main goal of the project was to promote and protect the rights of vulnerable families, women and children. The project had set a goal for 4 components such as legislation, Institutional development of SCFWCA, training and professional development, increasing awareness.

The project was managed by Mrs. Hijran Huseynova, Chairman of the State Committee on Family, Women and Children Affairs and Mrs. Marie Keirle, Head of the Department for European and International Affairs of General Directorate for Social Affairs. More than 40 experts from France and Europe have been involved in the project.

See also
Cabinet of Azerbaijan
Women in Azerbaijan

References

Government agencies of Azerbaijan
Government agencies established in 2006
2006 establishments in Azerbaijan
Women's ministries
Women's rights in Azerbaijan